East Fork Arkansas River is a  tributary of the Arkansas River that flows from a source in the Mosquito Range of central Colorado.  It joins with Tennessee Creek to form the Arkansas River west of Leadville, Colorado.

See also
List of rivers of Colorado

References

Rivers of Colorado
Tributaries of the Arkansas River
Rivers of Lake County, Colorado